Doug Pray is an American documentary film director, cinematographer, and editor who often explores unique subcultures in his films. His work includes Surfwise (2008), a portrait of the nomadic, 11-member Doc Paskowitz family (often referred to as the "first family of surfing"); Big Rig (2008), a documentary about truck drivers; Infamy (2005), a documentary about graffiti culture; Red Diaper Baby (2004) a solo-performance film starring Josh Kornbluth; Scratch (2001), a documentary about turntablism and DJ culture; and his first feature, Hype! (1996), a documentary about the explosion and exploitation of the Seattle grunge scene of the early 1990s. His most recent films are Levitated Mass, (2013) a film about the creation of Michael Heizer's massive sculpture at the Los Angeles County Museum of Art, and the Emmy Award-winning Art & Copy, a film about advertising and creativity that premiered at the 2009 Sundance Film Festival, and was distributed by PBS.

From 2014 to 2017, Doug Pray was Executive Producer, Writer, and Editor of the four-part HBO docu-series The Defiant Ones, directed by Allen Hughes, which chronicles the legendary careers and partnership of music producers Dr. Dre and Jimmy Iovine. It premiered in the U.S. on July 9, 2017, and was nominated for 5 Emmy Awards,  won Best Limited Series at the International Documentary Association (IDA) Awards, and won the 2018 Grammy Award for Best Music Film.

In addition to his documentaries, Doug Pray has directed a number of non-fiction style commercials and commissioned short films for such brands as Guinness, Adidas, Toyota, and Doc Martins. In 2006, he won an Emmy Award for an advocacy campaign about HIV-AIDS awareness.

Doug Pray was born in Denver and grew up in Madison, WI. He has a BA in sociology from Colorado College and an MFA from UCLA's School of Film and Television. He is a member of the Directors Guild of America and the Academy of Motion Picture Arts and Sciences. He lives in Los Angeles with his wife, Diana Rathe Pray, with whom he has two children.

Filmography (director)
Hype! (1996)
Scratch (2001)
Sundance 20 (2002)
Veer (2004)
Red Diaper Baby (2004)
Infamy (2005)
Big Rig (2008)
Surfwise (2008)
Art & Copy (2009)
Levitated Mass (2013)
Love, Lizzo (2022)

External links
 
 
 Art & Copy
 Surfwise
 Big Rig
 Infamy
 SWINDLE Magazine article on the making of "Big Rig"
 Levitated Mass, a film about Levitated Mass by Michael Heizer
 The Defiant Ones

American documentary filmmakers
American film directors
Year of birth missing (living people)
Living people